Dakore Egbuson-Akande (born Dakore Omobola Egbuson; 14 October 1978) is a Nigerian actress. She is an ambassador for Amnesty International, Amstel Malta and Oxfam of America.

Biography
Dakore was born in Bayelsa State as the first child of her parents. She attended Corona School and Federal Government Girls' College in Lagos and Bauchi respectively. She studied mass communication at the University of Lagos but had to drop out due to incessant strikes. She is currently married with 2 children.

In September 2019, Dakore appeared as a main feature in the Visual Collaborative electronic catalogue, in an issue themed Vivencias which translates to "Experiences" in Spanish. She was interviewed alongside 30 people from around the world such as Kelli Ali, Adelaide Damoah and Desdamona. In May 2020, Dakore's interview on the same Visual Collaborative platform republished in a series titled TwentyEightyFour, which was released during the peak of the COVID-19 pandemic, French music duo Les Nubians, Japanese Music composer Rika Muranaka and Nigerian comedian Chigul appeared in the same volume.

Filmography
Dakore has acted in more than 50 films, some of which include:
 Peace of Flesh
 Men do Cry
 Emotional Crack
 Shattered Illusion
 When the Going gets Tough
 Playboy
 Oracle
 Hole in the Heart
 Silent Tears
 11 days & 11 Nights
 Operation KTP
 Playboy
 Silent Tears
 Emotional Cry
 Caught in the Middle (2007)
 Journey to Self (2013)
 Lunch Time Heroes (2015)
 Fifty (2015)
 Isoken (2017)
  Chief Daddy (2018)
 New Money (2018)
 The Set Up (2019)
 Coming From Insanity
 Chief Daddy 2: Going for Broke
 A Sunday Affair (2023)

TV Shows 

 Castle & Castle (2021)

Awards and nominations

See also
List of Nigerian actors

References

External links
 Dakore Egbuson-Akande at the Internet Movie Database

Nigerian film actresses
People from Bayelsa State
21st-century Nigerian actresses
1978 births
Living people
University of Lagos alumni